Antin Varivoda (January 10, 1869 - March 12, 1936) was a Ukrainian Commander of the Legion of Ukrainian Sich Riflemen, and Colonel of the Ukrainian Galician Army.

Biography
Varivoda was born in the city of Seret in Bukovina.

He graduated from the Austrian officers' school. From the beginning of the First World War he led a sotnia in the Austrian army.

From 16 March to 30 September 1916 in the rank of colonel (oberstleutnant) in the Austro-Hungarian army, the commandant of the Legion of Ukrainian Sich Riflemen.

During the Polish-Ukrainian War (1918-1919) he was Colonel of the UGA. Appointed a member of the liquidation commission, he dealt with the return of Ukrainian soldiers from Austria and Italy to their homeland. In 1920 he commanded a brigade of interned UGA soldiers in Liberec (Czechoslovakia) and Jablonne (Germany).

He lived in Vienna, where he died on March 12, 1936.

References 

1869 births
1936 deaths
Ukrainian colonels
Ukrainian Galician Army people
Ukrainian military leaders
Romanian people of Ukrainian descent
People from Siret